Star Wars Resistance is an American 3D animated comic science fiction television series produced by Lucasfilm Animation. It follows Kazuda Xiono, a New Republic pilot who is recruited by the Resistance to spy on the growing threat of the First Order shortly before and during the events of the sequel trilogy.

The series premiered on Disney Channel on October 7, 2018, and the next day it debuted on Disney XD in the United States and worldwide. Twelve shorts debuted on the Disney Channel YouTube channel in December 2018.
The second and final season premiered on October 6, 2019 on Disney Channel, Disney XD and DisneyNow. The series ended on January 26, 2020 after forty episodes.

Resistance received generally positive reviews from critics. The series was nominated for the Primetime Emmy Award for Outstanding Children's Program for both of its seasons. It won the Saturn Award for Best Animated Series on Television in 2019 for its debut season.

Cast and characters

Main 
 Christopher Sean as Kazuda 'Kaz' Xiono, a young pilot for the New Republic who becomes a resistance spy onboard the Colossus
 Scott Lawrence as Jarek Yeager, the owner of Yeager's Repairs onboard the Colossus
 Josh Brener as Neeku Vozo, a talented Nikto technician
 Suzie McGrath as Tamara 'Tam' Ryvora, a mechanic and aspiring pilot
 Donald Faison as Hype Fazon, leader of the Ace Squadron who protect the Colossus
 Myrna Velasco as Torra Doza, one of the Ace Squadron pilots and the daughter of Captain Doza
 Jason Hightower as Captain Imanuel Doza, the captain of the Colossus
 Nazneen Contractor as Synara San, a member of the space pirate gang known as the Warbirds
 Liam McIntyre as Commander Pyre, a high-ranking officer in the First Order
 Sumalee Montano as Agent Tierny, an agent in the First Order Security Bureau

Recurring 
 Oscar Isaac as Poe Dameron, a commander in the resistance
 Bobby Moynihan and Jim Rash as Orka and Flix, the Chadra-Fan and Gozzo who run the Office of Acquisitions onboard the Colossus
 Tovah Feldshuh as Aunt Z, the Gilliand proprietor of Aunt Z's Tavern
 Justin Ridge as R1-J5, and old astromech droid better known as "Bucket"
 Mary Elizabeth McGlynn as Freya Fenris, one of the pilots of the Ace Squadron, and 4D-M1N, the command bridge droid who assists Captain Doza
 Stephen Stanton and Dave Filoni as Griff Halloran and Bo Keevil, the other two members of the Ace Squadron
 Elijah Wood as Jace Rucklin, a resident of the Colossus
 Gary Anthony Williams as Captain Kragan Gorr, the Quarren captain of the Warbird pirate gang
David Shaughnessy as Drell, a Weequay member of the Warbirds
 Lex Lang and Christine Dunford as Major Elrik Vonreg and Lt. Galek, officers in the First Order
 Antony Del Rio and Nikki SooHoo as Kel and Eila, a brother and sister who are stowaways on the Colussus
 Tasia Valenza as Venisa Doza, a resistance pilot and the wife of Captain Doza

The other residents of the Colossus are voiced by a group of recurring voice actors. Greg Proops, who had also voiced the race commentator Fode in Episode I – The Phantom Menace, voices race commentator Jak Sivrak as well as Garma, an elderly Arcona. Fred Tatasciore voices the Klatooinian gorg seller Bolza Grool and Dee Bradley Baker voices both Grevel, an irascible Aleena, and Glem, a Rodian dockworker. Jooks, a Thelin who lives on the Colossus is also voiced by Mary Elizabeth McGlynn.

The droid BB-8 appears for most of the first season.

Guest 
 Gwendoline Christie (season 1) and Ellen Dubin (season 2) as Captain Phasma, a high-ranking officer in the First Order
 Domhnall Gleeson (season 1) and Ben Prendergast (season 2) as General Hux, one of the highest-ranking officers in the First Order
 Anthony Daniels as C-3PO, a protocol droid working for the resistance. C-3PO's voice can be briefly heard over the intercom in the pilot episode
 Carolyn Hennesy as Princess Leia Organa, the leading general of the resistance
 Tzi Ma as Senator Hamato Xiono, Kazuda's father
 Frank Welker as the Chelidae, the shellfolk who are the engineers onboard the Colossus
 Matthew Wood as Ello Asty, a resistance pilot, and Kylo Ren, the Supreme Leader of the First Order
 Joe Manganiello as Ax Tagrin, an Iktotchi bounty hunter
 Lucy Lawless as the Queen of the Aeosians
 John DiMaggio as Vranki the Blue, a Hutt operating a casino
 Sam Witwer and Cherami Leigh as Hugh Sion and Mia Gabon, pilots for the New Republic and friends of Kazuda's
 Rachael MacFarlane as Lin Gaava, a friend of Jace Rucklin's
 Tudi Roche as Mika Grey, a Sith relic hunter
 Daveed Diggs as Norath Kev, a resistance pilot
 Steve Blum as Leoz, a Nikto pirate

Episodes

Season 1 (2018–19)
The series follows Kazuda Xiono, a New Republic pilot who is recruited by the Resistance to spy on the growing threat of the First Order. The first season begins six months before The Force Awakens and crosses over with it at the end of the 17th episode.

Season 2 (2019–20)
The second and final season picks up immediately afterwards, crossing over with The Last Jedi and leading up to The Rise of Skywalker.

Shorts
A series of shorts, depicting the lives of the Resistance cast, were released during a midseason break for the first season in 2018.

Production

Development 
On February 22, 2018, /Film reported that Lucasfilm had trademarked the name Star Wars Resistance for a wide range of merchandise and a potential animated series.
On April 26, the series was officially announced and scheduled for a Fall 2018 debut. The show was created by Dave Filoni, who previously directed the 2008 film Star Wars: The Clone Wars, developed the subsequent television series, created, developed and executive produced Star Wars Rebels, and in 2017 became the head of Lucasfilm Animation. Filoni said the show was influenced by anime and by his grandfather's experiences in World War II. By August 1, 2018, Polygon Pictures was selected as the animation production company.

On August 12, 2018, Filoni stated that he would not work as directly on Resistance in a day-to-day capacity as he had on previous projects due to his work on The Clone Wars revival. However, he provided direction and notes to the story team, a role he compared to George Lucas' input on The Clone Wars.

Casting 
Along with the official series announcement, it was announced that Oscar Isaac and Gwendoline Christie would reprise their roles as Poe Dameron and Captain Phasma, respectively. They are joined by Christopher Sean, Bobby Moynihan, Suzie McGrath, Scott Lawrence, Myrna Velasco, Josh Brener, Donald Faison and Jim Rash. General Leia Organa, Kylo Ren and  have appeared in the series.

Release

Marketing 
A trailer was released on August 17, 2018, showcasing the new animation style and characters. It received a negative reaction from fans, including criticism for its apparent targeting of younger viewers and both praise and criticism for the anime-style CGI. Blair Marnell of Nerdist compared the initial reaction to the early stigma The Clone Wars and Rebels suffered for similarly targeting younger demographics during release, only for both to become more positively received with subsequent seasons.

Broadcast 
The series debuted in the United States on the Disney Channel on October 7, 2018, with Disney XD airing the series later in the United States and worldwide, with the exception of Southeast Asia, where all live-action shows are sold by Disney's Southeast Asian channel. The series was renewed for a second season, which aired in October 2019. Its first episode, which picks up directly after the end of the first season, was screened at Star Wars Celebration in Chicago.

Season two premiered on Sunday, October 6, (10 p.m. EDT/PDT) on Disney Channel and DisneyNOW, with subsequent airings on Disney XD. Season two was the final season of the show and consisted of 19 episodes.

Home media 
As announced on July 23, 2019, Lucasfilm released the first season on DVD on August 20. It includes all 21 episodes of season one, as well as an exclusive sneak-peek at the making of the show with cast and crew, 4 audio commentaries with Sean, Lawrence, Brener and Velasco, the 12 shorts and Resistance Rewind.

The first season of Star Wars Resistance became available for streaming on November 12, 2019, the launch date for Disney+. The second season became available on February 25, 2020.

Reception

Critical response 
On review aggregator Rotten Tomatoes, season 1 has an approval rating of 92% based reviews from 13 critics, with an average rating of 5.60/10. The site's critics consensus states that "Star Wars: Resistance streamlined story sets the stage for exciting adventures—and seems poised to explore a canvas stocked with immediately relatable characters and plenty of potential."

William Hughes of The A.V. Club praised the first episode saying "At the end of its first hour, Resistance feels pleasantly primed with potential." He gave it a grade B.
Brian Lowry of CNN gave it a mixed review, he notes that previous Star Wars shows offered plenty for older fans but that this show was more clearly made for a younger audience, and "Star Wars Resistance paints with a much brighter, more colorful palette, but at least initially settles for more pallid characters and situations—the kind that don't immediately suggest this is the animated show you're looking for." Syfy Wire notes that "Resistances cel-shading animation style stands out amongst the franchise's traditional CG-animated fare." Emily Ashby of Common Sense Media called the series "lighthearted" and downplaying cartoon violence. She also argued that the series has a lot of humor, has characters demonstrate traits of determination and courage, saying that the series had vivid animation and "high-flying action" which dominates the series plot.

Awards

References 
Footnotes

Citations

External links 
 
 Star Wars Resistance at Disney+
 
 

Star Wars Resistance
2018 American television series debuts
2020 American television series endings
2010s American animated television series
2020s American animated television series
2010s American comic science fiction television series
2020s American comic science fiction television series
American children's animated action television series
American children's animated space adventure television series
American children's animated comic science fiction television series
American computer-animated television series
Animated television series about extraterrestrial life
Anime-influenced Western animated television series
Disney Channel original programming
Disney XD original programming
Interquel television series
Television series by Lucasfilm
Resistance
Animated television shows based on films